Ewen Green may refer to
 E. H. H. Green, British historian
 Ewen Green (chess player), New Zealand chess master